Niranjana, also rendered Niranjan, is an epithet in Hinduism. It is a title of Krishna according to the Bhagavad Gita, and is also an epithet of Shiva.

Etymology
Niranjan  in Sanskrit means the one without blemishes or the one who is spotless and pure. nir means less (as in e.g. motionless) and anjana means black colouring matter.

Description
Niranjan means the lord of the three worlds, the physical, the astral and the causal and according to the Bhagavad Gita.

The saint Kabir described God as Niranjan. Niranjan means is translated as without collyrium, or the spotless or immaculate God, and it is used to address Rama.

It is also 52nd name of the 108 names of Krishna as it appears in the Sri Krishna Ashtottara Shatanama Stotra.

In Dvadasha stotra, composed by Jagadguru Madhvacharya, the word Niranjan is explained as one the quality of Krishna.

References

Hindu deities